Calbert Gary James Osbourne (born 22 October 1969) is an English former professional footballer who played as a right winger or full-back in the Football League for Shrewsbury Town.

Career
Born in Wolverhampton, Osbourne signed for Shrewsbury Town on youth terms in the summer of 1988. He made three starts and four substitute appearances between 1988 and 1989 before he was released. He joined Telford United and then Stourbridge before signing for recently relegated Conference side Colchester United.

Colchester manager Ian Atkins brought Osbourne to the club in March 1991 to bolster the squad ahead of the final months of the season. Colchester were battling Barnet and Kettering Town for the Conference title, and after some promising displays for the Colchester reserve team, he was given his debut in April. He was brought on as a substitute to replace Nicky Smith during the U's 2–1 win at Gateshead on 1 April. He made five further starts for the club, but was released at the end of the season.

Osbourne returned to non-League football in the West Midlands, turning out for Cradley Town, Bilston Town, Redditch United, Sutton Coldfield Town, Tamworth, and a second stint at Stourbridge.

References

1969 births
Living people
Footballers from Wolverhampton
English footballers
Association football fullbacks
Association football wingers
Shrewsbury Town F.C. players
Telford United F.C. players
Stourbridge F.C. players
Colchester United F.C. players
Cradley Town F.C. players
Bilston Town F.C. players
Redditch United F.C. players
Sutton Coldfield Town F.C. players
Tamworth F.C. players
English Football League players
National League (English football) players